Carlos A. Chardon  López (born ca. 17 of January 1939) is a Puerto Rican educator and public servant. He has served twice as Secretary of the Puerto Rico Department of Education and subsequently served under Secretary of State Kenneth McClintock as the first and only Assistant Secretary of State for Governmental Affairs.

Biography
Chardón (birth name: Carlos A. Chardón López)  was born in Venezuela, when his parents were there while his father was doing research in mycology. His father, Carlos E. Chardón Palacios (1897 - 1965), was Puerto Rico's first mycologist and the first native to be appointed as Chancellor of the University of Puerto Rico. His uncle Carlos Fernando Chardón (1907-1981), served as the Puerto Rico Adjutant General and Secretary of State of Puerto Rico from 1969 to 1973.

Chardón López did graduate work at Syracuse University in New York state to earn his doctorate. During that time, Chardón worked at the Division of Human Rights of the State of New York as a field representative.

Political career
After returning to Puerto Rico, Chardón López was appointed as an aide to Governor Luis A. Ferré. A lifelong Republican, Chardón has served as Secretary of Puerto Rico's Republican Party and as a member of the Republican National Committee.

In the 1970s, Chardón López was first appointed as Secretary of Education of the commonwealth, under Governor Carlos Romero Barceló. In 1981 after he was the distinguish by the King of Spain, Juan Carlos 1, with the medal of Isabel La Catolica and the Interamerican Gold Medal .

More than 30 years later, under Governor Luis Fortuño, he was appointed again to the position.  He resigned on November 30, 2009, to take a position as Assistant Secretary for Governmental Affairs to Kenneth McClintock, Secretary of State of Puerto Rico. Chardón López also chaired the Board of Directors of the Urban Renewal and Housing Corporation (Corporación de Renovación Urbana y Vivienda, "CRUV" in Spanish).

During his first stint as Secretary of Education, he focused on improving the quality of teaching, increasing the number of teachers with master's degrees, developing English-language immersion courses and increasing the funding of education in the arts.  Chardón López subsequently served as Executive Vice President of the Museo de Arte de Ponce and also as Chairman of the Board of Trustees of the Puerto Rico Conservatory of Music.

At the federal level, he has served as liaison Representative of the Department of Health, Education and Welfare (HEW) (now Dept. of Health and Human Services). He also served as the Caribbean District Director for the U.S. Small Business Administration.  He also chaired the State Volunteer Action Board for AmeriCorps.

On a volunteer basis, Chardón López has also served as Vice Chairman of the Puerto Rico Academy of Arts and Sciences.

See also
List of Puerto Ricans
Carlos E. Chardón Palacios, father and mycologist

Notes

References

Puerto Rican educators
Puerto Rican people of French descent
Living people
Secretaries of Education of Puerto Rico
Syracuse University alumni
Republican Party (Puerto Rico) politicians
1939 births